Louis Vincent François (24 July 1906 – 15 November 1986) was a Greco-Roman wrestler from France who won a bronze medal at the 1932 Summer Olympics.

François was born in a family of miners, which later moved to Paris and became cement workers. He won seven national titles, in 1928, 1930–33, 1935 and 1937. François was an RATP employee by profession, and in parallel worked as a wrestling coach at US Metro and referee.

References

External links
 Louis François at quentin-lutte-olympique.wifeo.com
 

1906 births
1986 deaths
Olympic wrestlers of France
Wrestlers at the 1932 Summer Olympics
French male sport wrestlers
Olympic bronze medalists for France
Olympic medalists in wrestling
Medalists at the 1932 Summer Olympics
20th-century French people